The Old Rep (originally Birmingham Repertory Theatre) is the United Kingdom's first ever purpose-built repertory theatre, constructed in 1913, located on Station Street in Birmingham, England. The theatre was a permanent home for Barry Jackson's Birmingham Repertory Company, formed in 1911 from his amateur theatre group, The Pilgrim Players, founded in 1907. Jackson funded the construction of the theatre and established his professional company there.

Architect S. N. Cooke, a colleague from the Birmingham School of Art, collaborated with Barry Jackson in the creation of the theatre. Both Jackson and Cooke took inspiration from the democratic nature of theatres that they had visited in Germany. The design of The Old Rep was particularly influenced by Max Littmann's 1908 Künstlertheater in Munich.

In 2014, Birmingham Ormiston Academy, also known as BOA, successfully tendered for The Old Rep Theatre.

The theatre is situated just opposite New Street Station, from which a blue plaque, above the theatre's first floor windows, to Barry Jackson can be seen. Two doors down, Britain's oldest working cinema can be found, the Electric Cinema.

History

Construction on the venue began in October 1912 and continued day and night for four months. The Grade II listed building has been well-preserved and still retains many of its original features.

The theatre opened its doors on 15 February 1913 with a performance of William Shakespeare's Twelfth Night, preceded by a reading from Barry Jackson, of the poem The Mighty Line by resident playwright John Drinkwater. The company began what would become more than a century of history with a vision led by Jackson that theatre should "serve as art instead of making that art serve a commercial purpose." With a wealth of local talent, the theatre produced a rolling bill of plays reflecting both classic texts and new writing.

In 1917, the Birmingham Repertory Company became a pioneer in the theatre industry by becoming the first UK venue to appoint a female stage manager, Maud Gill. She left a fascinating and entertaining account of her experiences in her autobiography 'See the Players'. She was told that "a woman ought not to be put in charge of stagehands because "working men" would not take orders from her, but she decided that, since mothers has been keeping order in the home since the beginning of time, the way to go about it was to treat them as a mother would treat her family. It worked."

In 1923, Barry Jackson received a gold medal from the Birmingham Civic Society which was shortly followed by a knighthood in 1925 for his services to the theatre. Sir Barry Jackson's significant role in the Birmingham's arts scene was to be recognized once again in 1955 when he was awarded the Freedom of the City.

The theatre was awarded its first Arts Council England grant in 1954 worth £3,000 which now equates to £77,000. Shortly after in 1960, Barry Jackson met with Birmingham City Council and Arts Council England to guarantee the funding to build a new arts venue. This was eventually agreed in 1968, and plans for the new Rep began to take place.

In 1971, they moved to a newly built theatre on Broad Street, now known as Birmingham Repertory Theatre, with The Old Rep taken into ownership by Birmingham City Council. However, this wasn't the last time the company would be based at Station Street, returning to The Old Rep between 2011 and 2013 while the Birmingham Repertory Theatre and the Library of Birmingham underwent redevelopment. The company celebrated their centenary year at their original home with a programme of performances, tours and creative activities for the people of Birmingham.

Patrons of The Old Rep include Brian Cox (actor), Brian Blessed, June Brown, Annette Badland and Toyah Willcox.

Performers
The Old Rep has played a central role in the early careers of many of the UK's most celebrated actors and theatre-makers. A few notable names who have all performed at The Old Rep include:
Laurence Olivier
Joined the company for a year from 1927 to 1928. He performed as Tony Lumpkin in She Stoops to Conquer, Malcolm in William Shakespeare's Macbeth and also appeared in The Taming of the Shrew and Uncle Vanya. In 1947 he was also the youngest actor to be Knighted.
Paul Schofield
Performed in Shakespeare's Hamlet in 1942, as part of the Rep Travelling Company. Whilst performing as Toad in Toad of Toad Hall (1944). He met Peter Brook and they went on to have a lifelong collaboration. In a 2004 Royal Shakespeare Company poll stated that his performance in William Shakespeare's King Lear was the best ever.
Peter Brook
Made his directing debut at The Old Rep in 1945 directing Man and Superman written by George Bernard Shaw.
Michael Gambon
Spent three years with the Royal National Theatre at The Old Vic. He was advised by Laurence Olivier to join the Birmingham Repertory Company to gain more experience in performing. He went on to star alongside Brian Cox (actor) in Othello in 1968.
Gwen Ffrangcon-Davies
Took a lead role, alongside Ion Swinley, as Juliet in William Shakespeare's Romeo and Juliet.
Jane Freeman (actress)
She had performed numerous roles at the Repertory Theatre. She went on to play a part on BBC's Last of the Summer Wine as Ivy.
Peggy Ashcroft
Joined the Rep straight from drama school. She starred alongside Laurence Olivier in John Drinkwater (playwright)'s Bird in Hand in 1927.
Derek Jacobi
Had a starring role as Henry VII in William Shakespeare's Henry VIII (play).
Brian Cox (actor)
Starred in William Shakespeare's Othello in 1968, alongside Michael Gambon. Cox is now also a patron of The Old Rep.
Edith Evans
She appeared as The Oracle in Part VI of George Bernard Shaw's Man and Superman in 1945.
Ralph Richardson
Played Traino in a 1928 production of The Taming of the Shrew. His three-year stint also included performances of The Importance of Being Earnest, The Farmer's Wife and Dear Brutus.
Albert Finney
Starred alongside actress June Brown in William Shakespeare's Macbeth in 1958.
June Brown
Starred as Lady Macbeth in Macbeth in 1958, alongside actor Albert Finney who played the lead role.
John Gielgud
Took a lead role in William Shakespeare's tragedy Romeo and Juliet in 1924.
Richard Chamberlain
Took a lead role in William Shakespeare's tragedy Hamlet in 1969.
Julie Christie
Appeared in the Christmas Revue Between These Four Walls in 1963.
Toyah Willcox
Attended The Old Rep's drama school in her late-teens and participated in many of their shows including Separate Tables and charity fashion shows at Warwick Castle. Willcox is now a patron of The Old Rep.

References

External links

 The Old Rep Official Website
 

Theatres in Birmingham, West Midlands
Theatres completed in 1913
Birmingham City Council
Producing theatres in England
1913 establishments in England